Lodovico is an Italian masculine given name, and may refer to:

 Cigoli (1559–1613), Italian painter and architect
 Lodovico, Count Corti (1823–1888), Italian diplomat
 Lodovico Agostini (1534–1590), Italian composer
 Lodovico Altieri (1805–1867), Italian cardinal
 Lodovico Balbi (1540–1604), Italian composer
 Lodovico Belluzzi (19th century), Captain Regent of San Marino
 Lodovico Bertucci (17th century), Italian painter
 Lodovico di Breme (1780–1820), Italian writer
 Lodovico Campalastro, Italian painter
 Lodovico Castelvetro (circa 1505–1571), Italian literary critic
 Lodovico delle Colombe (1565(?) – after 1623), Italian scholar
 Lodovico Dolce (1508–1568), Italian humanist
 Lodovico Ferrari (1522–1565), Italian mathematician
 Lodovico Filippo Laurenti (1693–1757), Italian composer
 Lodovico Fumicelli (16th century), Italian painter
 Lodovico Gallina (1752–1787), Italian painter
 Lodovico Giustini (1685–1743), Italian composer
 Lodovico Grossi da Viadana (circa 1560–1627), Italian composer
 Lodovico Guicciardini (1521–1589), Italian writer
 Lodovico Lazzarelli (1447–1500), Italian poet
 Lodovico Leoni (1531–1606), Italian painter
 Lodovico Ricci (1742–1799), Italian historian
 Lodovico Rocca (1895–1986), Italian composer
 Lodovico Trevisan (1401–1465), Italian bishop
 Lodovico Zacconi (1555–1627), Italian-Austrian composer

Fiction: 
 Lodovico, son of Gratiano, cousin to Desdemona

See also
 Ludovico

Italian masculine given names